Rabih, also spelled Rabee, Rabea, Rabeeh, Rabi, or Rabie, is an Arabic masculine given name meaning "spring". It is common in the Arab world and has no religious significance.

People
Given name
 Rabih Abou-Khalil, Lebanese musician
 Rabih Alameddine, Lebanese-American painter and writer
 Rabih Ataya (born 1989), Lebanese footballer
 Rabih Noureddine, Electronic engineering professor 
 Rabee Jaber, Lebanese author
 Rabih Jaber, Swedish singer of Lebanese origin
 Rabi ibn Sabih, Islamic scholar
 Rabi ibn Sabra, Islamic scholar
 Rabie Yassin, Egyptian football player
 Ramy Rabie, Egyptian football player
 Rabih az-Zubayr, Sudanese warlord and slave-trader, 1842–1900
 Rabi Kinagi, Bengali film director
Family name
 Ramy Rabie, Egyptian football player
 Mohammed Rabia, Omani football player
  Rabih elbarry, Lebanese basketball player #15

Arabic masculine given names